Bassman is a surname. Notable people with the surname include:

Don Bassman (1927–1993), American sound engineer
George Bassman (1914–1997), American composer
Lillian Bassman (1917–2012), American photographer
Reds Bassman (1913–2010), American football player
Rick Bassman (born 1961), American entrepreneur